The 1957 Pittsburgh Steelers season was the team's 25th season in the National Football League. For the first time, the Steelers' yellow helmets sported uniform numbers.  Pittsburgh would use these uniforms through the 1961 season.

Regular season

Schedule

Game summaries

Week 1 (Sunday September 29, 1957): Washington Redskins 

at Forbes Field, Pittsburgh, Pennsylvania

 Game time: 
 Game weather: 
 Game attendance: 27,452
 Referee: 
 TV announcers: 

Scoring drives:

 Pittsburgh – Mathews 17 pass from Morrall (Glick kick)
 Washington – Podoley 38 pass from LeBaron (Baker kick)
 Pittsburgh – Young 3 run (Glick kick)
 Pittsburgh – Girard 42 pass from Morrall (Glick kick)
 Pittsburgh – Girard 32 pass from Morrall (Glick kick)

Week 2 (Saturday October 5, 1957): Cleveland Browns  

at Forbes Field, Pittsburgh, Pennsylvania

 Game time: 
 Game weather: 
 Game attendance: 35,570
 Referee: 
 TV announcers: 

Scoring drives:

 Cleveland – Renfro 32 pass from Hanulak (Groza kick)
 Pittsburgh – Girard 21 pass from Morrall (kick blocked)
 Cleveland – FG Groza 29
 Cleveland – FG Groza 45
 Pittsburgh – Girard 32 pass from Morrall (kick blocked)
 Cleveland – FG Groza 14
 Cleveland – Campbell 25 pass from O'Connell (Groza kick)

Week 3 (Sunday October 13, 1957): Chicago Cardinals  

at Forbes Field, Pittsburgh, Pennsylvania

 Game time: 
 Game weather: 
 Game attendance: 29,446
 Referee: 
 TV announcers: 

Scoring drives:

 Pittsburgh – Derby 2 run (kick blocked)
 Chicago Cardinals – FG Summerall 33
 Pittsburgh – Wells 96 kick return (kick failed)
 Chicago Cardinals – FG Summerall 27
 Pittsburgh – O'Neill 23 run with blocked kick (Girard kick)
 Pittsburgh – Morrall 1 run (Girard kick)
 Pittsburgh – FG Girard 15
 Chicago Cardinals – Sears 49 run (Summerall kick)
 Chicago Cardinals – McHan 1 run (Summerall kick)

Week 4 (Sunday October 20, 1957): New York Giants  

at Yankee Stadium, Bronx, New York

 Game time: 
 Game weather: 
 Game attendance: 52,589
 Referee: 
 TV announcers: 

Scoring drives:

 New York Giants – Schnelker 18 pass from Conerly (Agajanian kick)
 New York Giants – Schnelker 10 pass from Conerly (Agajanian kick)
 New York Giants – Rote 18 pass from Gifford (Agajanian kick)
 New York Giants – Patton 50 interception (Agajanian kick)
 New York Giants – MacAfee 28 pass from Clatterbuck (Agajainan kick)

Week 5 (Sunday October 27, 1957): Philadelphia Eagles  

at Forbes Field, Pittsburgh, Pennsylvania

 Game time: 
 Game weather: 
 Game attendance: 27,016
 Referee: 
 TV announcers: 

Scoring drives:

 Pittsburgh – Mathews 35 pass from Morrall (kick failed)

Week 6 (Sunday November 3, 1957): Baltimore Colts  

at Forbes Field, Pittsburgh, Pennsylvania

 Game time: 
 Game weather: 
 Game attendance: 42,575
 Referee: 
 TV announcers: 

Scoring Drives:

 Baltimore – Berry 5 pass from Unitas (kick blocked)
 Pittsburgh – Mathews 48 pass from Morrall (Glick kick)
 Pittsburgh – Mathews 22 pass from Morrall (Glick kick)
 Baltimore – Shaw 8 run (Rechichar kick)
 Pittsburgh – FG Glick 16
 Pittsburgh – Safety, Unitas tackled by McPeak in end zone

Week 7 (Sunday November 10, 1957): Cleveland Browns  

at Cleveland Municipal Stadium, Cleveland, Ohio

 Game time: 
 Game weather: 
 Game attendance: 53,709
 Referee: 
 TV announcers: 

Scoring drives:

 Cleveland – FG Groza 34
 Cleveland – Renfro 49 pass from O'Connell (Groza kick)
 Cleveland – P. Carpenter 13 pass from O'Connell (Groza kick)
 Cleveland – Paul 89 fumble run (Groza kick)

Week 9 (Sunday November 24, 1957): Green Bay Packers  

at Forbes Field, Pittsburgh, Pennsylvania

 Game time: 
 Game weather: 
 Game attendance: 29,701
 Referee: 
 TV announcers: 

Scoring drives:

 Pittsburgh – FG Glick 17
 Green Bay – Starr 1 run (Cone kick)
 Green Bay – Ferguson 40 run (Cone kick)
 Green Bay – Parilli 5 run (Cone kick)
 Pittsburgh – McClairen 14 pass from Morrall (Glick kick)
 Green Bay – FG Cone 24
 Green Bay – FG Cone 12

Week 10 (Sunday December 1, 1957): Philadelphia Eagles  

at Connie Mack Stadium, Philadelphia, Pennsylvania

 Game time: 
 Game weather: 
 Game attendance: 16,364
 Referee: 
 TV announcers: 

Scoring drives:

 Pittsburgh – FG Glick 17
 Philadelphia – Bielski 7 pass from Jurgensen (Walston kick)
 Pittsburgh – FG Glick 23

Week 11 (Saturday December 7, 1957): New York Giants  

at Forbes Field, Pittsburgh, Pennsylvania

 Game time: 
 Game weather: 
 Game attendance: 19,772
 Referee: 
 TV announcers: 

Scoring drives:

 Pittsburgh – Reger 14 fumble run (Glick kick)
 New York Giants – Gifford 40 pass from Conerly (Agajanian kick)
 Pittsburgh – Morrall 12 run (Glick kick)
 New York Giants – FG Agajanian 12
 Pittsburgh – Nickel 5 pass from Morrall (Glick kick)

Week 12 (Sunday December 15, 1957): Washington Redskins  

at Griffith Stadium, Washington, DC

 Game time: 
 Game weather: 
 Game attendance: 22,577
 Referee: 
 TV announcers: 

Scoring drives:

 Pittsburgh – FG Glick 35
 Washington – FG Baker 45
 Washington – Baker 11 run (Baker kick)

Week 13 (Sunday December 22, 1957): Chicago Cardinals  

at Comiskey Park, Chicago, Illinois

 Game time: 
 Game weather: 
 Game attendance: 10,084
 Referee: 
 TV announcers: 

Scoring drives:

 Pittsburgh – McClairen 48 pass from Morrall (Derby kick)
 Pittsburgh – Rogel 1 run (Derby kick)
 Chicago Cardinals – Safety, Beatty snap to Girard went out of end zone
 Pittsburgh – FG Derby 34

Standings

References

Pittsburgh Steelers seasons
Pittsburgh Steelers
Pitts